Common Brittonic, also known as British, Common Brythonic, or Proto-Brittonic, was a Celtic language spoken in Britain and Brittany.

It is a form of Insular Celtic, descended from Proto-Celtic, a theorized parent tongue that, by the first half of the first millennium BC, was diverging into separate dialects or languages. Pictish is linked, likely as a sister language or a descendant branch.

Evidence from early and modern Welsh shows that Common Brittonic was significantly influenced by Latin during the Roman period, especially in terms related to the church and Christianity. By the sixth century AD, the tongues of the Celtic Britons were rapidly diverging into Neo-Brittonic: Welsh, Cumbric, Cornish, Breton, and possibly the Pictish language.

Over the next three centuries, Brittonic was replaced in most of Scotland by Scottish Gaelic and by Old English (from which descend Modern English and Scots) throughout most of modern England as well as Scotland south of the Firth of Forth. Cumbric disappeared in the 12th century and, in the far south-west, Cornish probably became extinct in the eighteenth century, though its use has since been revived. O'Rahilly's historical model suggests a Brittonic language in Ireland before the introduction of the Goidelic languages, but this view has not found wide acceptance. Welsh and Breton are the only daughter languages that have survived fully into the modern day.

History

Sources

No documents in the tongue have been found, but a few inscriptions have been identified. The Bath curse tablets, found in the Roman feeder pool at Bath, Somerset (Aquae Sulis), bear about 150 names – about 50% Celtic (but not necessarily Brittonic). An inscription on a metal pendant (discovered there in 1979) seems to contain an ancient Brittonic curse: 
"". (Sometimes the final word has been rendered .) This text is often seen as: "The affixed – Deuina, Deieda, Andagin [and] Uindiorix – I have bound." else, at the opposite extreme, taking into account case-marking –  "king" nominative,  "worthless woman" accusative,  "divine Deieda" nominative/vocative – is:
"May I, Windiorix for/at Cuamena defeat [or "summon to justice"] the worthless woman, [oh] divine Deieda."

A tin/lead sheet retains part of 9 text lines, damaged, with likely Brittonic names.

Local Roman Britain toponyms (place names) are evidentiary, recorded in Latinised forms by Ptolemy's Geography discussed by Rivet and Smith in their book of that name published in 1979. They show most names he used were from the tongue. Some place names still contain elements derived from it. Tribe names and some Brittonic personal names are also taken down by Greeks and, mainly, Romans.

Tacitus's Agricola says that the tongue differed little from that of Gaul. Comparison with what is known of Gaulish confirms the similarity.

Pictish and Pritenic
Pictish, which became extinct around 1000 years ago, was the spoken language of the Picts in Northern Scotland. Despite significant debate as to whether this language was Celtic, items such as geographical and personal names documented in the region gave evidence that this language was most closely aligned with the Brittonic branch of Celtic languages. The question of the extent to which this language was distinguished, and the date of divergence, from the rest of Brittonic, was historically disputed.

Pritenic (also Pretanic and Prittenic) is a term coined in 1955 by Kenneth H. Jackson to describe a hypothetical Roman era (1st to 5th centuries) predecessor to the Pictish language. Jackson saw Pritenic as having diverged from Brittonic around the time of 75-100 AD.

The term Pritenic is controversial. In 2015, linguist Guto Rhys concluded that most proposals that Pictish diverged from Brittonic before c. 500 AD were incorrect, questionable, or of little importance, and that a lack of evidence to distinguish Brittonic and Pictish rendered the term Prittenic "redundant".

Diversification and Neo-Brittonic
Common Brittonic vied with Latin after the Roman conquest of Britain in 43 AD, at least in major settlements. Latin words were widely borrowed by its speakers in the Romanised towns and their descendants, and later from church use.

By 500–550 AD, Common Brittonic had diverged into the Neo-Brittonic dialects: Old Welsh primarily in Wales, Old Cornish in Cornwall, Old Breton in what is now Brittany, Cumbric in Northern England and Southern Scotland, and probably Pictish in Northern Scotland.

The modern forms of Breton and Welsh are the only direct descendants of Common Brittonic to have survived fully into the 21st century. Cornish fell out of use in the 1700s but has since undergone a revival. Cumbric and Pictish are extinct and today spoken only in the form of loanwords in English, Scots, and Scottish Gaelic.

Phonology

Consonants

Vowels

The early Common Brittonic vowel inventory is effectively identical to that of Proto-Celtic.  and  have not developed yet.

By late Common Brittonic, the New Quantity System had occurred, leading to a radical restructuring of the vowel system.

Notes:

Grammar
Through comparative linguistics, it is possible to approximately reconstruct the declension paradigms of Common Brittonic:

First declension

Notes:
 The dative dual and plural represent the inherited instrumental forms, which replaced the inherited dative dual and plural, from Proto-Celtic , .

Second declension

Notes:

 Neuter 2nd declension stems deviate from the paradigm as such:

Notes:

 Dual is same as singular
 All other declensions same as regular 2nd declension paradigm

Third declension

Place names
Brittonic-derived place names are scattered across Great Britain, with many occurring in the West Country; however, some of these may be pre-Celtic. When river is preceded by the word, in the modern vein, it is tautological.

Examples of place names derived from the Brittonic languages

Examples are:
 Avon from  = 'river' (cf. Welsh , Cornish , Breton )
 Britain, cognate with  = (possibly) 'People of the Forms' (cf. Welsh  'Britain',  'appearance, form, image, resemblance'; Irish  'appearance, shape', Old Irish  'Picts')
It means 'water(s)' (cognate with old Welsh , plural phonetically , Cornish , Breton , and Irish , its orthography  denoting  or  phonetically)
 Kent from  = 'border' (becoming in Welsh  'rim, brim', in Breton)
 Lothian, ( in medieval Welsh) from * 'Fort of Lugus'
 Thames from  = 'dark' (likely cognate with Welsh  'darkness', Cornish , Breton , Irish , pointing to a Brittonic approximate word )
 Thanet (headland) from  = 'bonfire', 'aflame' (cf. Welsh  'fire', Cornish , Old Breton  'aflame')  
 York from  = 'yew tree stand/group'  (cognate with Welsh , from  'cow parsnip, hogweed' +  'abundant in', Breton  'alder buckthorn', Scottish Gaelic  'yew',  'stand/grove of yew trees'; cognate with Évreux in France, Évora in Portugal and Newry, Northern Ireland) via Latin  > OE  (re-analysed by English speakers as  'boar' with Old English  appended at the end) > Old Norse 

Tautologous, two-tongue names exist in England, such as:
Derwentwater (for Brittonic part see Dover above)
Chetwood, (cognate with Welsh , Breton )
Bredon Hill

Notes

References

Bibliography

 Filppula, M.; Klemola, J.; Pitkänen, H. (2001); The Celtic Roots of English, (Studies in Languages, No. 37); University of Joensuu, Faculty of Humanities; .
 Forsyth, K. (1997), Language in Pictland.
 Jackson, Kenneth H. (1953), Language and History in Early Britain.
 Jackson, Kenneth H. (1955), "The Pictish Language"; in F. T. Wainwright, The Problem of the Picts; London: Nelson.
 Koch, John T. (1986), "New Thought on Albion, Ieni and the 'Pretanic Isles'", Proceedings of the Harvard Celtic Colloquium, 6: pp. 1–28.
 Lambert, Pierre-Yves [ed.] (2002), Recueil des inscriptions gauloises II.2. Textes gallo-latins sur instrumentum; Paris: CNRS Editions; pp. 304–306.
 Lambert, Pierre-Yves (2003), La langue gauloise; 2nd ed.; Paris: Editions Errance; p. 176.
 Lockwood, W. B. (1975), Languages of the British Isles Past and Present; London: Deutsch; .
 Ostler, Nicholas (2005), Empires of the Word; London: HarperCollins; .
 Price, Glanville. (2000), Languages of Britain and Ireland; Blackwell; .
 Rivet, A. and Smith, C. (1979), The Place-names of Roman Britain
 Sims-Williams, Patrick (2003), The Celtic Inscriptions of Britain: Phonology and Chronology, c. 400–1200; Oxford, Blackwell; .
 Ternes, Elmar [ed.] (2011), Brythonic Celtic – Britannisches Keltisch: From Medieval British to Modern Breton; Bremen: Hempen Verlag.
 Trudgill, P. [ed.] (1984), Language in the British Isles; Cambridge University Press.
 Willis, David (2009), "Old and Middle Welsh"; in The Celtic Languages, 2nd ed.; eds. Martin J. Ball & Nichole Müller; New York: Routledge; ; pp. 117–160.

External links
Celtic Personal Names of Roman Britain

Roman road stations of the Cannock-Chase area
 Alex Mullen (2007), "Evidence for Written Celtic from Roman Britain: A Linguistic Analysis of Tabellae Sulis 14 and 18", Studia Celtica

Extinct Celtic languages
History of the Welsh language
Brythonic Celts
Proto-languages